Jiří Valenta (born 14 February 1988) is a Czech footballer who plays for German club Bischofswerda.

Honours
Czech Republic under-21
FIFA U-20 World Cup runner-up (1) 2007

References

 
 
 Football
 

1988 births
Living people
Czech footballers
Czech Republic youth international footballers
Czech Republic under-21 international footballers
Association football midfielders
FK Jablonec players
1. FC Slovácko players
FK Senica players
FK Viktoria Žižkov players
FK Mladá Boleslav players
FC Shakhter Karagandy players
FC Silon Táborsko players
FK Fotbal Třinec players
Bischofswerdaer FV 08 players
Czech First League players
Slovak Super Liga players
Czech National Football League players
Kazakhstan Premier League players
Bohemian Football League players
Oberliga (football) players
Czech expatriate footballers
Expatriate footballers in Slovakia
Czech expatriate sportspeople in Slovakia
Expatriate footballers in Kazakhstan
Czech expatriate sportspeople in Kazakhstan
Expatriate footballers in Germany
Czech expatriate sportspeople in Germany